Dobrodol (Hungarian: Dobradó or Dobradópuszta) is a village in Serbia. It is located in the Irig municipality, in the Srem District, Vojvodina province. The village has a Hungarian ethnic majority and its population numbering 127 people (2002 census).

Historical population

1981: 129
1991: 126

See also
List of places in Serbia
List of cities, towns and villages in Vojvodina

References
Slobodan Ćurčić, Broj stanovnika Vojvodine, Novi Sad, 1996.

External links 

History

Populated places in Syrmia